The following highways in Virginia have been known as State Route 23:
 State Route 23 (Virginia 1918-1933), Stuart to West Virginia towards Bluefield
 U.S. Route 23 (Virginia), early 1930s - present